The Well's on Fire is the eleventh studio album by Procol Harum, released in 2003. The album was Matthew Fisher's last studio album with the band, and his last live release with them was Live at Union Chapel, recorded in December 2003 and including many of the songs from the studio album. It was also their last studio album to feature lyrics from Keith Reid.

Reception

Allmusic hailed The Well's on Fire as Procol Harum's "finest album in nearly 30 years", remarking that it goes for a more rock-based sound than its predecessor The Prodigal Stranger and recaptures the worthy elements of the band's heyday without relying solely on nostalgia. Individually noting the still potent talents of core members Matthew Fisher, Gary Brooker, and Keith Reid, they concluded that Procol Harum "have demonstrated that they're capable of making relevant music again."

Track listing
All music by Gary Brooker and lyrics by Keith Reid, except where noted.
"An Old English Dream" 
"Shadow Boxed"
"A Robe of Silk" 
"The Blink of an Eye" 
"The VIP Room" 
"The Question" (Matthew Fisher, Keith Reid)
"This World Is Rich (For Stephen Maboe)"
"Fellow Travellers" - based on "Lascia Ch'io Pianga" by George Frideric Handel (Fisher, Reid)
"The Wall Street Blues"
"The Emperor's New Clothes"
"So Far Behind" 
"Every Dog Will Have His Day" (Brooker, Fisher, Reid)
"Weisselklenzenacht (The Signature)" (Fisher)

Personnel
Procol Harum
 Gary Brooker - piano, vocals 
 Matthew Fisher - organ
 Geoff Whitehorn - guitar
 Matt Pegg - bass guitar
 Mark Brzezicki - drums, percussion
 Keith Reid - lyrics
with:
 Roger Taylor - backing vocals (2)
Technical
 Rafe McKenna - producer
 Joshua J Macrae - engineer

Cover Version
Les Fradkin covered "Fellow Travellers" as part of a Beyond the Pale compilation. It also appears in his 2006 release, Goin' Back.

References

External links
 ProcolHarum.com - ProcolHarum.com's page on this album

2003 albums
Procol Harum albums
Eagle Records albums